The Spitsbergen Airship Museum (Luftskipsmuseet på Spitsbergen) is a museum located on the island of Spitsbergen in Longyearbyen, the capital of the Arctic Ocean archipelago Svalbard. It has been formally renamed as the North Pole Expedition Museum. It was co-founded by the Italian Stefano Poli and the Norwegian Ingunn Løyning. Plans to open the museum began in 2005. Originally a new building was supposed to be built to house the museum, but following a fallout with one of the share-owners in 2007 this idea was scrapped, and instead the Airship Museum was opened in 2008 in Longyearbyen's former pig farm, which previously had housed the Svalbard Museum as well.

The year of opening was chosen due to its significance as the International Polar Year, the 80th anniversary of the Italia's crash, and the 30th anniversary of polar explorer and aviator Umberto Nobile's death. Several descendants of Nobile, and of Roald Amundsen who died during the rescue of the Italia crew, attended the opening ceremony, which was held on 15 November 2008. In July 2012 the museum was relocated, to a newly constructed building closer to central Longyearbyen.

There is a long history of aviation in modern Svalbard, documented by the Spitsbergen Airship Museum. Exhibits include artefacts from, and information relating to, several major expeditions carried out during the exploration of the Arctic region. Among these exploits are the journeys of airships such as the America (several failed attempts to reach the North Pole, 1906–1909), the Norge (first trip to the North Pole and first flight over the polar cap in 1926), and the Italia (and the subsequent rescue effort following its 1928 crash). Also featured is the 1897 expedition of the balloonist Salomon August Andrée, and the attempts to discover its fate. It attempts to portray these events in a neutral tone, taking no sides. The museum's collection includes a ribbon granted to Nobile by Benito Mussolini, parts of the Norge logbook, aircraft models, international newspaper clippings, and other various objects connected to the expeditions.

See also

 Archaeology of Svalbard
 History of Svalbard
 List of museums in Svalbard

References

External links
North Pole Expedition Museum website

2008 establishments in Norway
Aerospace museums in Norway
History museums in Norway
Longyearbyen
Museums established in 2008
Museums in Svalbard